The Bar Association of Sri Lanka (BASL) is the Bar association in  Sri Lanka.  The Institute was established in 1974, amalgamating the Bar Council of Sri Lanka which  represented the Advocates and Law Society of Sri Lanka represented the Proctors, after the amalgamation of both branches into a group of practitioners called the Attorneys-at-law under the Justice Law No. 44 of 1973 . Membership is optional for any Attorney-at-law. Traditionally the President of the Bar Association of Sri Lanka is considered the head of the unofficial bar.

Past Presidents
 Hector Wilfred Jayewardene, QC (1975 - 1977)
 Eardley Perera, PC (1977 - 1979)
 A. C. Gooneratne, QC (1979 - 1981) 
 A. C. de Zoysa (1981 - 1983)
 Herman J C Perera (1983 - 1985)
 Nimal Senanayake, PC (1985 - 1987)
 H. L. de Silva, PC (1987 - 1989) 
 Desmond Fernando, PC (1989 - 1991)  
 Ranjith Abeysuriya, PC (1991 - 1993)  
 D. W. Abeyakoon, PC (1993 - 1995)  
 N R M Daluwatte, PC (1995 - 1997)   
 Romesh de Silva, PC (1997 - 1999)  
 Upali A. Gooneratne, PC (1999 - 2001)   
 Ajantha W. Athukorala  (2001 - 2003)  
 Ananda Wijesekera, PC (2003 - 2004)
 M Ikram Mohamed, PC (2004 - 2005) 
 Desmond Fernando, PC (2005 - 2006) 
 Nihal Jayamanne, PC (2006 - 2008)  
 W. Dayaratne, PC (2008 - 2010) 
 Shibly Aziz, PC (2010 - 2012)  
 Wijeyadasa Rajapakshe, PC (2012 - 2013)  
 Upul Jayasuriya, PC (2013 - 2015)   
 Geoffrey Alagaratnam, PC (2015 - 2017)  
 U. R. De Silva, PC (2017 - 2019)
 Kalinga Indatissa, PC (2019 - 2021)
 Saliya Pieris, PC (2021 -   )

See also
Attorney General's Department (Sri Lanka)

References

External links
website

Sri Lanka
Organizations established in 1974
Professional associations based in Sri Lanka
Bar associations of Asia
Law of Sri Lanka